Chanderi, is a town of historical importance in Ashoknagar District of the state Madhya Pradesh in India. It is situated at a distance of 127 km from Shivpuri, 37 km from Lalitpur, 55 km from Ashok Nagar and about 46 km from Isagarh.  It is surrounded by hills southwest of the Betwa River. Chanderi is surrounded by hills, lakes and forests and is spotted with several monuments of the Bundela Rajputs and Malwa sultans. It is famous for ancient Jain Temples.
Its population in 2011 was 33,081.

History
Chanderi is mentioned by the Persian scholar Alberuni in 1030.
Ghiyas ud din Balban captured the city in 1251 for Nasiruddin Mahmud, Sultan of Delhi. Sultan Mahmud I Khilji of Malwa captured the city in 1438 after a siege of several months. Rana Sanga of Mewar conquer much of the Malwa along with Chanderi and appointed his vassal Medini Rai  a rebellious minister of Sultan Mahmud II of Malwa as ruler of Malwa under his lordship. Medini Rai made Chanderi as capital of his kingdom. In the Battle of Chanderi, the Mughal Emperor Babur captured the fort from Medini Rai and witnessed the macabre Rajput rite of jauhar, in which, faced with certain defeat and in an attempt to escape dishonor in the hands of the enemy, women with children in their arms jumped in a fire pit to commit suicide, which was made for this specific purpose, against the background of vedic hymns recited by the priests. Jauhar was performed during the night and in the morning the men would rub the ashes of their dead women folk on their forehead, don a saffron garment known as kesariya, chew tulsi leaves (in India tulsi leaves are placed in the mouth of a dead body), symbolizing their awareness about impending death and resolve to fight and die with honour. This method of fighting & dying for the cause of retaining honour was called saka. In 1529, Puran Mal was defeated by Babur's forces after he tried to recapture Chanderi.

In 1542 it was captured by Sher Shah Suri and added to the governorship of Shujaat Khan.
The Mughal Emperor Akbar made the city a sarkar in the subah of Malwa.

The Bundela Rajputs captured the city in 1586, and it was held by Ram Sab, a son of Raja Madhukar of Orchha. In 1646 Devi Singh Bundela was made ruler of the city, and Chanderi remained in the hands of his family until it was annexed in 1811 by Jean Baptiste Filose for the Maratha ruler Daulat Rao Sindhia of Gwalior.
The city was transferred to the British in 1844.
The British lost control of the city during the Revolt of 1857, and the city was recaptured by Hugh Rose on 14 March 1858. Richard Harte Keatinge led the assault, for which he was awarded the Victoria Cross. The city was transferred back to the Sindhias of Gwalior in 1861, and became part of Isagarh District of Gwalior state.

Chanderi fought for independence of India under the leadership of Bundelkhand Kesri Dewan Shatrughan Singh and his Rani Rajendra Kumari.

After India's independence in 1947, Gwalior became part of the new state of Madhya Bharat, which was merged into Madhya Pradesh on 1 November 1956.

Geography
It has an average elevation of 456 metres (1496 feet).

Demographics
 India census, Chanderi had a population of 28,313. Males constitute 52% of the population and females 48%.

Access
There is a good roadway network in Chanderi. The town lies at State Highway 20 and National Highway 376 with connections to Ashoknagar, Ishagarh, Lalitpur etc.

There is no railway service in or near Chanderi but necessary administrative measures were adopted in 2014 for a line to be operated by Northern Railways on a  Pipraigaon-Chanderi-Lalitpur route.

Jainism at Chanderi
The Chanderi area has been a major center of Jain culture. It was a major center of the Parwar Jain community. There are a number of Jain places nearby- Gurilagiri (7 km), Aamanachar (29 km), Bithala (19 km), Bhamon (16 km), Khandargiri (2 km), Thuvanji (22 km) and Bhiyadant (14 km), and Deogarh, Uttar Pradesh (20 km, across the border).

The Jain Bhattarakas of Mula Sangh, Balatkara Gana had a center at Chanderi that flourished for several centuries. The lineage, as constructed by Pt. Phulachandra Shastri is as following:

 Devendrakirti (see Balatkara Gana), who awarded Singhai title in 1436 CE (see Parwar (Jain))
 Tribhuvanakirti (anointed in Vikram Samvat 1522),
 Sasasrakirti
 Padmanandi
 Yashahkirti
 Lalitkirti
 Dharmakirt
Padmakirti (died Vikram Samvat 1717)
 Sakalakirti
 Surendrakirti (pratishtha in Vikram Samvat 1746)

A branch of this lineage continued at Sironj.

 Jagatkirti (pupil of Dharmakirti above)
 Tribhuvanakirti
 Narendrakirti
 Unknown
 Rajkirti
 Devendrakirti (pratishtha in samvat 1871)

Jain Temple
List of Jain temples at Chanderi:

 Shri Choubeesee Bara Mandir : This temple has 2 parts with front part is known as Bara mandir and back part called Choubeesee mandir. As suggested by inscription this temple was built around year 1293(V.S. 1350). This temple was renovated in 13th to 18th century. This temple has 24 idols for 24 Tirthankars and these idols are made by the stones of actual colors as the Tirthankar. All idols are same in dimensions, which is very difficult in real.

 Shri Parasnath Digamber Jain Purana mandir Jain temple : It is one of the oldest jain temple in chanderi containing idols of Shri Prasnath ji of 7th century.

 Shri Khandargiri Jain temple : It is one of the most famous religious site in Chanderi. This temple has a 45 feet carved idol of Rishabhnatha. Inscriptions suggest that this statue is over 700 years old. Six caves have been cut out of the hillside. Inside there are a number of religious carvings of Jain saints and decorations carved into the existing hillside. The oldest cave is cave 6 that dates back to 1236.
 Shri thobonji Jain temple : This temple belongs to 9th century. Moolnayak of this temple is light blue colored idol colossal of Adinath of height 36 feet 8 inches. The other colossal idols in this temple are Bhagwan ParshVanatha of height 13 feet 4 inches and Bhagwan Parshwanath of height 12 feet 6 inches.
 Shri Chandraprabha digambar Jain temple : This temple is dedicated to Chandraprabha, the 8th tirthankar of Jainism. Oldest inscription date back to year 967 AD.

In popular culture 
 Stree – The 2018 horror-comedy film Stree, about a witch who abducts men at night, is set and shot in the town of Chanderi.
 Sui Dhaaga – Some parts of this Anushka Sharma and Varun Dhawan starrer film were shot in Chanderi. In this film the weaving setup was from Chanderiyaan Chanderi
Gudiya Humari Sabhi Pe Bhari serial shot in Chanderi, starting with Chanderi Bus stand whose named Lalitpur Bus Adda and background of Kila Kothi.
Janhit Mein Jaari starring Nushrratt Bharuccha on Zee5 is set in Chanderi with major portions filmed there.

See also
 Chanderi sari

Transport 
The nearest airport is Gwalior.

References

Sources

 
 Hunter, William Wilson, James Sutherland Cotton, Richard Burn, William Stevenson Meyer, eds. (1909).
 Imperial Gazetteer of India, vol. 9. Oxford, Clarendon Press.

External links

 Shri Digamber Jain Atishaya Kshetra Choubeesee Bara Mandir, Chanderi
 Shri Digamber Jain Atishaya Kshetra Khandargiri
 Shri Digamber Jain Atishaya Kshetra Thuvonji
Chanderi Geographical Index Website
 Film on the master weavers of Chanderi
 Chanderi: Travel Guide Goodearth Publications, New Delhi, 2006.

Cities and towns in Ashoknagar district
Jain rock-cut architecture
9th-century Jain temples
13th-century Jain temples